Buddleja caryopteridifolia W.W.Sm. is a small deciduous shrub discovered by George Forrest in 1913 on open ground at 3,000 m on the Tong Shan in the Yangtze valley, China.  The species was described and named by William Wright Smith in 1914.<ref name=Smith>Smith W.W. (1914). Notes Royal Botanic Gardens Edinburgh 8: 179.</ref>

Resembling B. crispa, it was sunk under this name by Leeuwenberg, although it has recently been restored as a separate species. It is likely that some specimens previously grown under this name at the Royal Botanic Gardens Edinburgh were actually Buddleja sterniana. Although the name is known in horticulture, plants sold as this species are most likely B. x Wardii of an unknown origin.

DescriptionBuddleja caryopteridifolia grows to 2 m in height in the wild, and bears small upright terminal panicles with relatively few flowers in the autumn. The colour of the sweetly scented flowers is generally pink or lilac. The grey-green opposite foliage, is similar to smaller forms of B. crispa, the leaf blade ovate to triangular and with an irregular toothed margin, shortly petiolate; the species is named for the foliage which can resemble that of several species of the genus Caryopteris.

Cultivation
Authentic examples of Buddleja caryopteridifolia'' are not currently in cultivation beyond China.

References

caryopteridifolia
Flora of Myanmar
Flora of China
Flora of Yunnan